The Product of Pain is the second album for Houston rap artist Gemini. It features the song "Crazy for You".

Track listing

References

2003 albums
Gemini (rapper) albums